Gustave Van Goethem (28 December 1898 – 15 October 1974) was a Belgian footballer. He played in one match for the Belgium national football team in 1924.

References

External links
 

1898 births
1974 deaths
Belgian footballers
Belgium international footballers
Association football midfielders
People from Berchem
Footballers from Antwerp